Fiona O'Shaughnessy is an Irish film, stage, and television actress.

Early life

O'Shaughnessy was born in Galway. Her family moved to Reading, Berkshire, when she was 9. She returned to Galway a decade later where she pursued a career in theatre.

She dated Irish comedian David McSavage for a period of time.

Career

Stage
O'Shaughnessy's most notable stage role to date is that of Salome for the Gate Theatre in Dublin. Other stage work has included The Shaughraun for the Abbey Theatre in Dublin, which transferred to the West End's Albery Theatre in 2005. In 2006 she appeared in the UK premiere of Blackwater Angel by Jim Nolan at the Finborough Theatre, London. Other work for the Gate Theatre includes Arms and the Man, Oliver, The Importance of Being Earnest, Pride and Prejudice, Blythe Spirit, Present Laughter (which toured in Charleston, South Carolina), See You Next Tuesday, and Cat on a Hot Tin Roof. She played Cate in the Irish debut of Sarah Kane's play Blasted.

Film and television
Her film roles include Clara in Goldfish Memory, The Halo Effect, and The Stronger. Other theatre work includes playing Hilde Wangle in Lady from the Sea and Petra Stockman in Enemy of the People at the Arcola Theatre, London, and Amy in 'The Night Alive' at The Geffen Playhouse in Los Angeles. She starred as Jessica Hyde in the television series Utopia. In 2015, she starred with David Troughton in the comedy romantic horror film Nina Forever.

Filmography

Film

Television

References

External links
 

People from County Galway
Irish stage actresses
Living people
Irish television actresses
21st-century Irish actresses
Irish film actresses
20th-century Irish actresses
Actresses from Galway (city)
Actresses from Berkshire
People from Reading, Berkshire
20th-century English women
20th-century English people
21st-century English women
21st-century English people
1979 births